The Second Gutwein Ministry is a former ministry of the Government of Tasmania, led by Peter Gutwein of the Tasmanian Liberals. It was formed on 19 May 2021, after the Liberal Party won the 2021 Tasmanian state election. The ministry dissolved on 8 April 2022, after Gutwein resigned from his premiership and quit politics, and was succeeded by the Rockliff ministry.

Final arrangement
On 10 February 2022, Sarah Courtney resigned from the cabinet and parliament. A reshuffle was undertaken on 17 February 2022. Roger Jaensch gained the education, skills and children and youth portfolios from Courtney, while Jane Howlett gained disability services and hospitality portfolios from Courtney, but losing the sports portfolio to Nic Street, who was elevated to the cabinet. Street also gained the heritage portfolio from Jaensch,  community services and development from Deputy Premier Jeremy Rockliff and science and technology from Michael Ferguson. Ferguson gained local government and planning from Jaensch.

A week later, Howlett resigned from the cabinet, and all her portfolios were taken over by Madeleine Ogilvie on 28 February who was elevated to cabinet.

First arrangement

References

Gutwein 2